William Russell Logan Bauld (24 January 1928 – 11 March 1977) was a footballer who played for Newtongrange Star, Heart of Midlothian, Edinburgh City and the Scotland national team.

Heart of Midlothian

Bauld was born in Newcraighall, Edinburgh and joined Hearts from junior side Newtongrange Star in 1946 and was immediately loaned to Edinburgh City. Upon his return, he made an immediate impact, scoring a hat-trick on his debut for the first-team. He, along with striking team-mates Alfie Conn and Jimmy Wardhaugh, became known as the Terrible Trio. He helped Hearts to a Scottish Cup triumph in 1956, the League Championship in 1957–58 and 1959–60 and League Cup successes in 1955 and 1959.

He scored 355 goals in 510 Hearts games.

Scotland

Bauld was capped three times by Scotland, all in 1950, scoring two goals. He also scored 15 goals in 13 appearances for the Scottish League XI.

Career statistics

International appearances

International goals
Scores and results list Scotland's goal tally first.

References

External links

Profile at London Hearts

1928 births
1977 deaths
Association football forwards
Edinburgh City F.C. (1928) players
Heart of Midlothian F.C. players
Newtongrange Star F.C. players
Scotland international footballers
Scottish Football Hall of Fame inductees
Scottish Football League players
Scottish Football League representative players
Scottish footballers
Footballers from Edinburgh
Scottish league football top scorers
Place of death missing
People educated at Musselburgh Grammar School